Khorramabad (also Romanized as Khorramābād; also known as Khūrramābād) is a village in Shamsabad Rural District, in the Central District of Arak County, Markazi Province, Iran. At the 2006 census, its population was 763, in 213 families.

References 

Populated places in Arak County